General elections are scheduled to be held in Bangladesh in January 2024.

Background
The current Sangsad (11th) is scheduled to expire on 29 January 2024, as the first session of this parliament sat on 30 January 2019 and the tenure of a parliament lasts five years.

The Awami League won the 2018 general elections and formed the government.

Electoral system
The 350 members of the Jatiya Sangsad consist of 300 directly elected seats using first-past-the-post voting in single-member constituencies, and an additional 50 seats reserved for women. The reserved seats are elected proportionally by the elected members. Each parliament sits for a five-year term.

Parties and alliances

Candidates

Results

Constituency-wise

References

General
Bangladesh
General elections in Bangladesh
General